John Hornor Jacobs is an American author, best known for the novel Southern Gods, which began as a rough draft created through the NaNoWriMo process, and was nominated for a Bram Stoker Award for Best First Novel in 2011. His 2015 novel Foreign Devils was nominated for a David Gemmell Award for Fantasy.

Early life
Jacobs was born in Little Rock, Arkansas, where he attended Little Rock Central High School.

The Incorruptibles
Published in paperback by Gollancz in 2014, The Incorruptibles is a fantasy novel by Hornor. It centers on two mercenaries: Shoestring, a half-dwarf/human; and Fisk, a human. They are employed to guard a nobleman and his family as they journey along a river by paddleboat. The novel was followed by Foreign Devils in 2015.

Reception

James Lovegrove, reviewing The Incorruptibles for the Financial Times, commended Jacobs' ability to "blend ... cowboys, the Roman empire and high fantasy". The Arkansas Times review praised his "wholly original and deeply imaginative voice".  The Incorruptibles has also been reviewed by the British Fantasy Society, SFFWorld, and SFBook Reviews.

Works
 Southern Gods (2011)
 Fierce as the Grave: A Quartet of Horror Stories (2011)
 This Dark Earth (Gallery Books, 2012)
 The Twelve-fingered Boy (2013)
 The Shibboleth (2014)
 The Incorruptibles (Gollancz, 2014)
 The Conformity (2015)
 Foreign Devils (2015)
 Infernal Machines (2017)
 The Sea Dreams It Is the Sky (2018)
 A Lush and Seething Hell (2019)
 Murder Ballads and Other Horrific Tales'' (2020)

References

External links
 JohnHornor.com, official website
 Library holdings of The Incorruptibles

1971 births
20th-century American novelists
21st-century American novelists
American fantasy writers
American horror writers
American science fiction writers
Lyon College alumni
Living people
Writers from Little Rock, Arkansas